California's 25th district may refer to:

 California's 25th congressional district
 California's 25th State Assembly district
 California's 25th State Senate district